Strzelce Wielkie  is a village in Pajęczno County, Łódź Voivodeship, in central Poland. It is the seat of the gmina (administrative district) called Gmina Strzelce Wielkie.

The village has a population of 1,100.

References

Villages in Pajęczno County